Heartworms is the fifth studio album by American rock band The Shins, released by Columbia Records on March 10, 2017—the band's first studio album in five years. It was produced by James Mercer, with the exception of "So Now What", which was produced by former band member Richard Swift. The album art is based on the Japanese Ukiyo-e triptych Takiyasha the Witch and the Skeleton Spectre.

Reception

Overall, Heartworms received positive reviews from critics. On Metacritic, which assigns a normalized rating out of 100 to reviews from mainstream publications, it has an average score of 73, based on twenty reviews.

Accolades

Track listing

Personnel 
Credits are adapted from the album's liner notes.

The Shins

 James Mercer – vocals, guitar (all tracks); bass (1, 2, 7–9, 11), synthesizers (3, 4, 6, 7), percussion (5, 8), chord organ (5, 11), ukulele, harmonica (11)
 Joe Plummer – drums (1, 4, 6–10)
 Yuuki Matthews – synthesizers (1–9, 11), drums (3), percussion (3, 5, 6), bass (4, 6, 10)
 Mark Watrous – guitar (1, 4, 8), piano (1, 8, 9), strings (4, 11), kalimba (4), bass synth (5), castanets (6)
 Jon Sortland – drums (2)
 Richard Swift – synthesizers, Mellotron (4, 6, 10); drums (4), percussion (4, 10)

Additional musicians

 Chris Funk – guitar, dulcimer (2); baritone guitar (11)
 Steve Drizos – percussion (2)

Technical

 James Mercer – production (1–9, 11)
 Richard Swift – production (10)
 Yuuki Matthews – mixing
 Brian Lucey – mastering
 Jacob Escobedo – artwork, design

Charts

The Worm's Heart 

In December 2017, the band announced that a "flipped" version of Heartworms would be released on January 19, 2018. Titled The Worm's Heart, the follow-up album contains the same songs as Heartworms, but reinterpreted and presented in reverse-order. According to Mercer, slow songs were played faster, quiet songs louder, and vice versa.

Track listing

Charts

References

2017 albums
Columbia Records albums
The Shins albums